Sai Sam Htun (also spelt Sai Sam Tun; born 10 April 1946) is a Burmese businessman and founder of Loi Hein Company, a major Burmese consumer product manufacturer, known for its bottled water, energy drink, soft drink, beer and cigarette lines.

He earned a medical degree in 1971 and an MBA from Washington University in St. Louis in the United States in 2008. He lived in Canada for 5 years, and in the United States from 1987 to 1991 before returning in 1992. He also owns Yadanabon FC.

References

Burmese businesspeople
1946 births
Living people
Burmese people of Shan descent
Washington University School of Medicine alumni
Olin Business School (Washington University) alumni